Robert Deans is the name of:
Bob Deans (1884–1908), New Zealand rugby union player,
Robbie Deans (born 1959), New Zealand rugby union coach and former player

See also
Robert Dean (disambiguation)
Robert Deane (disambiguation)